The Inmaculada Concepción Seminary is located in Villa Devoto, Buenos Aires, Argentina. Pope Francis studied in it during his youth. It was built in 1899.

References

Churches completed in 1899
Buildings and structures in Buenos Aires
Roman Catholic churches in Buenos Aires